Route 91 is a short highway in southeastern Missouri.  Its northern terminus is at Route 51 in Bollinger County; its southern terminus is at U.S. Route 61 in Morley.  The last  southbound run east, not south.

Major intersections

References

091
Transportation in Bollinger County, Missouri
Transportation in Stoddard County, Missouri
Transportation in Scott County, Missouri